Tevie Harold Miller (January 1, 1928 – August 21, 1996) was a Canadian lawyer and judge. He served as Chancellor of the University of Alberta from 1986 to 1990.

Miller was born in Edmonton to Abe Miller, a lawyer, and Rebecca Griesdorf Miller. He attended the University of Alberta (BA 1949, LLB 1950) and was a lawyer. He was appointed as a judge in 1974. From 1984 to 1993, he was Associate Chief Justice of the Court of Queen's Bench. He also served on the Supreme Court of the Northwest and Yukon Territories as a Deputy Judge. Miller was a member of the University of Alberta's Board of Governors and Senate, and elected to serve as Chancellor from 1986 to 1990. In 1996, he died of pancreatic cancer.

References

1928 births
1996 deaths
Chancellors of the University of Alberta
Deaths from pancreatic cancer
Lawyers in Alberta
People from Edmonton
University of Alberta alumni